Hexaamminenickel chloride is the chemical compound with the formula [Ni(NH3)6]Cl2.  It is the chloride salt of the metal ammine complex [Ni(NH3)6]2+. The cation features six ammonia (called ammines in coordination chemistry) ligands attached to the nickel(II) ion.

Properties and structure
[Ni(NH3)6]2+, like all octahedral nickel(II) complexes, is paramagnetic with two unpaired electrons localized on each Ni center. [Ni(NH3)6]Cl2 is prepared by treating aqueous nickel(II) chloride with ammonia.  It is useful as a molecular source of anhydrous nickel(II).

References

Nickel complexes
Inorganic compounds
Chlorides
Metal halides
Octahedral compounds
Ammine complexes